Lucknow Lok Sabha constituency is one of the 80 Lok Sabha (parliamentary) constituencies in Uttar Pradesh state in northern India. It is one of the two lok sabha constituencies that lies in the largest and capital city of the state, Lucknow.

Since 1991 the seat has been held by the BJP. Its best-known MP is Former Prime Minister, Atal Bihari Vajpayee. Vajpayee contested from this seat eight times. First time, he contested 1955 bypoll and came third. Then he came second in 1957 and 1962. After these 3 losses, he won the seat five consecutive times, in 1991, 1996, 1998, 1999 and 2004.

Assembly Segments

Members of Parliament

^ by-poll

Election results

2019 results

2014 results

2009 results

2004 results

1999 results

1998 results

1996 results

1991 results

1989 results

1984 results

1980 results

1977 results

1971 results

1967 results

1962 results

1957 results

1955 bypoll results

1951-52 results

See also
 Lucknow district
 List of Constituencies of the Lok Sabha
 Lucknow (Mayoral Constituency)
 Lucknow (Division Graduates Constituency)
 Lucknow Rural Lok Sabha constituency

References

External links
http://ceouttarpradesh.nic.in/035_PC_Statistics_English.aspx
http://ceouttarpradesh.nic.in/171_AC_Statistics_English.aspx
http://ceouttarpradesh.nic.in/172_AC_Statistics_English.aspx
http://ceouttarpradesh.nic.in/173_AC_Statistics_English.aspx
http://ceouttarpradesh.nic.in/174_AC_Statistics_English.aspx
http://ceouttarpradesh.nic.in/175_AC_Statistics_English.aspx

Lok Sabha constituencies in Uttar Pradesh
Politics of Lucknow district